Still Woman Enough is a 2002 autobiography of American country music singer Loretta Lynn, written by Lynn and Patsi Bale Cox.  The book discusses, in-depth, Lynn's life, from her early days in Butcher Hollow, Kentucky, as the daughter of a coal miner, her marriage to Oliver "Doolittle" Lynn, her musical career, and personal triumphs and trials in Lynn's life up to the time the book was written.

References

2002 non-fiction books
Music autobiographies
American country music
Loretta Lynn